Jack Kramer defeated Tom Brown 9–7, 6–3, 6–0 in the final to win the men's singles tennis title at the 1946 U.S. National Championships.

Seeds
The seeded players are listed below. Jack Kramer is the champion; others show the round in which they were eliminated.

  Frank Parker (quarterfinals)
  Yvon Petra (second round)
  Jack Kramer (champion)
  Alejo Russell (fourth round)
  Gardnar Mulloy (semifinals)
  Pierre Pellizza (fourth round)
  Bill Talbert (quarterfinals)
  Felicisimo Ampon (third round)
  Donald McNeill (quarterfinals)
  Enrique Morea (first round)
  Tom Brown (finalist)
  Harry Hopman (second round)
  Pancho Segura (quarterfinals)
  Bernard Destremau (first round)
  Robert Falkenburg (semifinals)
  Philippe Washer (second round)
  Seymour Greenberg (fourth round)
  Robert Barnes (third round)
  Frank Guernsey (third round)
  Derrick Barton (third round)

Draw

Key
 Q = Qualifier
 WC = Wild card
 LL = Lucky loser
 r = Retired

Final eight

Earlier rounds

Section 1

Section 2

Section 3

Section 4

Section 5

Section 6

Section 7

Section 8

References

External links
 1946 U.S. National Championships on ITFtennis.com, the source for this draw

Men's Singles
1946